The Reid-Baldwin Adobe, formerly called the Hugo Reid Adobe, is an adobe home built in 1839. It is currently located at the Los Angeles County Arboretum and Botanic Garden in Arcadia, California. The Hugo Reid Adobe was designated a California Historic Landmark (No. 368) on April 3, 1940. The Reid Adobe was built by Scottish−Mexican Hugo Reid on the shore of what is now called Baldwin Lake with the help of local natives. Reid received the full Mexican land grant for Rancho Santa Anita in 1845, which included 13,319 acres of land. Reid farmed some of the land and planted grape vines.

Hugo Reid (1811–1852), born in Scotland, was an early resident of Los Angeles County who became a naturalized citizen of California (then a part of Mexico) and who married a respected Gabrieleño woman, Victoria Reid. Victoria was born at the village of Comicranga and taken to San Gabriel Mission at the age of six, yet had acquired land through her first marriage and elevated Hugo's status.

Elias Jackson “Lucky” Baldwin purchased Rancho Santa Anita in 1875. In 1879 Baldwin added a wooden wing to the old adobe home. Elias Jackson "Lucky" Baldwin (1828–1909) was a pioneer of California business, an investor, and real estate speculator during the second half of the 19th century. He earned the nickname "Lucky" Baldwin due to his extraordinary good fortune in a number of business deals. He built the luxury Baldwin Hotel and Theatre in San Francisco and bought vast tracts of land in Southern California, where a number of places and neighborhoods are named after him.

In 1947 the state and county acquired the land to create an arboretum around the lake and historic Reid-Baldwin structures.

Reconstruction
Without a good roof adobe structures can be damaged fast. With a good roof adobe structures still need constant maintenance. The Rancho-Era California Adobe is currently under repair and reconstruction, with completion expected in 2023.
The original home was built with sun-dried adobe bricks, made with clay soil, water, and straw to add strength. The original adobe home's roof was made of rawhide animal skin used to tie giant cane reeds together. The roof was then coated with tar. The original reconstruction of the Hugo Reid Adobe tried to use much of the original methods and materials.

Marker
Proposed State Marker for the site reads:
''NO. 368 REID-BALDWIN ADOBE – Reid, a Scotsman, petitioned the government of Mexico to grant him Rancho Santa Anita. His claim strengthened by his marriage to Victoria, a native Indian of the San Gabriel Mission, he received the grant on April 16, 1841. Immediately upon filing his petition, Reid took possession of the land, started to farm and plant vineyards, and built the first house – the Hugo Reid Adobe – in 1839. In 1875, E. J. Baldwin purchased the rancho and in 1879 added a wooden wing to the old adobe.

See also
 Reid-Baldwin Adobe Historical Markers
Santa Anita Train Depot
Queen Anne Cottage and Coach Barn
California Historical Landmarks in Los Angeles County 
List of California Ranchos

References

California Historical Landmarks
1839 establishments in Alta California
Arcadia, California